The Strangers film series consists of American psychological horror films. Based on an original story by Bryan Bertino, the plot centers around masked three psycho-sociopathic home invaders that prey on the innocent owners. Though the first film was marketed as "based on a true story", this was a misdirect as the filmmaker stated that he wrote the concept from a series of break-in burglaries that took place in his neighborhood when he was growing up, as well as borrowing elements from the Manson Family Tate killings. Continuing this marketing technique, a "based on a true story" tag was also included at the beginning of the sequel.

The first film was initially met with mixed critical reception upon its release, though it made a large profit at the box office. Despite this, it has since been praised by contemporary film critics, as a cult classic in the horror genre. Conversely, its sequel was met with negative reception with criticism directed towards its inferiority to the original, while making much less monetary gain. Alternatively, some critics have positively reviewed the movie with the statement that it too deserves a cult following, stating in elaboration that where the first film was a tribute to 1970s horror films, the second film was meant to replicate the scares of the 1980s.

The series will continue in the 2020s with three additional films entering production back-to-back.

Film

The Strangers (2008) 

After attending their friend's wedding reception, James Hoyt and Kristen McKay, a young couple, whose relationship is in trouble, stop at Hoyt's secluded summer home for the night. In the midnight hours as the couple discusses their future and are attempting to sort out their differences, a knock comes at the door. When they answer a woman asks for someone who does not live there. As time passes by, she persistently repeats the process. As the couple begin to question her intentions, things quickly escalate as the vacation home is taken under siege by three psychopathic masked strangers. The trio of assailants terrorize the couple through the night, while James and Kristen fight to survive. As they work together, they try to determine what these invaders want, and search for an escape before its too late.

The Strangers: Prey at Night (2018) 

Ten years after the events of the first movie, Mike and his wife Cindy plan a family getaway. Striving to bond with their troubled teenage children, Luke and Kinsey, the couple plan to visit some relatives in Kalida, Ohio before the latter goes away to boarding school. Arriving at their destination, deserted mobile home park, the family discusses their plans for their stay. In the dead of night, their discussion is interrupted with a knock at the door of the trailer home they rented. Upon answering, a woman asks for someone that is not there with them. As the night continues, she relentlessly continues the process. Just when they begin to question the woman's intentions, three masked serial killer strangers begin to torment and hunt the family members. Frantically making their way to their relatives' home, they discover the couple to be murdered. With no escape, the family must work together despite their differences, as they fight to stay alive.

Future 
In August 2022, producer Roy Lee announced that three sequels would consecutively enter production beginning in September of that year. Though the director was not announced at the time, Lee stated that the filmmaker attached to the projects is well known to horror movie fans. After discussing the projects with Bloody Disgusting, the company stated that the only other time a number of horror films had been completed in this manner with their sequels, was when Netflix created The Fear Street film series. Renny Harlin was revealed to serve as director for at least one of the sequels, if not all of them.

Later that month Harlin was officially announced as director on the three upcoming films; the first of the new trilogy, from a script written by Alan R. Cohen and Alan Freedland. Courtney Solomon, Mark Canton, Christopher Milburn, Gary Raskin, Charlie Dombeck, and Alastair Birlingham will serve as producers on the three movies, while Andrei Boncea, Dorothy Canton, and Roy Lee are slated to be executive producers. Madelaine Petsch and Froy Gutierrez were cast in the lead roles, while Gabriel Basso will appear in a supporting role. Though tabloids announced the projects as a "remake", the new trilogy is intended to be a relaunch of the series with producer Canton stating that the trilogy is intended to introduce new audiences to "world of The Strangers". Solomon stated that when they began the project the intent was to tell a bigger story than before, respecting what fans of the series expect, but also to "expand that world". The producer describes the three movies as a "character study", compared to the previous two films. The trilogy will be a joint-venture production between Lionsgate Films and Frame Film, and will be distributed by Lionsgate Entertainment.

Untitled third film 

Directed by Renny Harlin, with a script written by Alan R. Cohen and Alan Freedland; the plot centers around a young woman as she drives across-country with her long-time boyfriend to start a new life together in the Pacific Northwest. When their car breaks down in Venus, Oregon, the couple is forced to rent an isolated Airbnb for the night. Through the night, they fight to stay alive as three masked strangers terrorize their stay.

Starring Madelain Petsch an Froy Guiteirrez, with Gabriel Basso in a supporting role, the film will serve as the first of trilogy of films. The movies will be produced back-to-back, with principal photography starting on September 13, 2022, in Bratislava, Slovakia. The film centers around Petsch and Guiteirrez's characters who are forced to spend the night in a secluded Airbnb home when they have car troubles. Through the night the three masked strangers torment the couple. The film is produced by Lionsgate Films, and will be distributed by Lionsgate Entertainment.

Untitled fourth film 
The second film of an intended trilogy, the project will be filmed consecutively with the previous movie. Directed by Harlin, with Petsch reprising her role, the plot will follow the events of previous film; while the story will expand in "new and unexpected ways". Produced by Lionsgate Films, it will be distributed by Lionsgate Entertainment.

Untitled fifth film 
The third and final movie in a new trilogy of films, the project is being produced back-to-back with the two previous installments. Renny Harlin serves as director, while Madelain Petsch reprises her role as the star of the three films. The plot is stated to "expand" and explore the characters in "unexpected ways". The project is produced by Lionsgate Films, with distribution handled by Lionsgate Entertainment.

Principal cast and characters

Additional crew and production details

Reception

Box office and financial performance

Critical and public response

In other media

Music video 

The music video for the single "Withorwithout" by indie pop-rock band Parcels, was released in October 2018. Based on The Strangers film series, the video was directed by Benjamin Howdeshell, with a script he co-wrote with Mike Doyle. The plot of the video clip follows a similar premise to the films. Milla Jovovich and Carsten Nørgaard star as the couple whose home is invaded, while members of the band: Jules Crommelin, Patrick Hetherington, Noah Hill, Anatole Serret, and Louie Swain portray the home assailants. The music video includes a plot twist at the end, revealing that the wife is responsible, having faked a home invasion and murdered her husband.

It was later revealed that it was Jovovich's idea to turn the plot around with the reveal that the whole story had been in her character's head, serving as her alibi to the law enforcement. The actress, who served as executive producer stated that her parent-instincts would did not like the concept of the band being the real killers. Explaining that they are "sweet boys", she stated: "I [told them], 'I should be the killer.’ I'm sort of known for that anyway and by the way, it would take a lot more than five boys to break into my house. I felt like this could be a really interesting springboard." With the release of the single's music video, renowned artist Laurent Melki created a movie poster similar to the work he has completed before, with the artist saying: "...I imagined this poster as being that of a horror film and I illustrated it as I would have done for a "Freddy" or a blockbuster from the time when movie posters reflected an artist's imagination..."

The music video received praise from horror critics, and received attention from producers of the film series as well. Shortly after its release, producer Roy Lee approached Howdeshell with the idea of creating a feature-length film based on the video. The filmmaker alongside Doyle began writing a script that they pitched to the associated studios. Jovavich expressed interest in reprising her role from the music video. Speculation arose in September 2022, that one of the three sequels being made, may be based on the concept.

Related films 
The same record player scrub of Gillian Welch's "My First Lover", first used in The Strangers (2008) the first time Kristen sees one of the intruders to be wearing a mask, is sampled as an "infinitely creepy record loop on the radio" in the 2009 British found footage analog horror short film No Through Road from Steven Chamberlain, as well as in the last episode of his subsequent 2011–2012 sequel web series, with the music first briefly playing on the radio before repeating at the end of the film as a similarly-masked man (portrayed by Chamberlain) slowly approaches four teenagers sitting in a car.

The titular characters of The Strangers make cameo appearances in the 2012 metafictional horror comedy film The Cabin in the Woods from Drew Goddard and Joss Whedon, portrayed by uncredited stand-ins, as some of the various populates released from the monster cells at the end of the film, subsequently seen burning a trio of security guards on the CCTV monitors.

References 

 
American film series
Slasher film series
Film series introduced in 2008